Gulzara Singh Mann (born 4 July 1924) was an Indian middle-distance runner. He competed in the men's 3000 metres steeplechase at the 1952 Summer Olympics.

References

External links
  

1924 births
Possibly living people
Athletes (track and field) at the 1952 Summer Olympics
Indian male middle-distance runners
Indian male steeplechase runners
Olympic athletes of India
Place of birth missing